Sir Guy de Beauchamp (born c. 1335 - died 28 April 1360), Knight, was an English nobleman and heir apparent to the title of Earl of Warwick, being the eldest son of the 11th Earl of Warwick. He served as a military commander in the army of Edward III in France, where he was mortally injured in a freak hailstorm during the Siege of Chartres on 13 April. He died three weeks later on 28 April 1360.

Career 
He was knighted with his brother, Thomas, in July 1355, when the King was with the fleet in the Downs on the way to an invasion of France. For his good service, he was granted an annual pension of L100 27 November 1355.

Marriage and issue 
Guy de Beauchamp married Philippa de Ferrers before 1353: daughter of Henry de Ferrers, 2nd Lord Ferrers of Groby, and Isabel de Verdun, daughter and co-heiress of Thebaud de Verdun, Knight, 2nd Lord Verdun.  His widow Philippa died 5 August 1384, and was buried at Necton, Norfolk. He left a will dated 26 September 1359.

Together they had two daughters:
 Elizabeth (died c. 1369), nun at Shouldham.
 Katherine, nun at Shouldham. 
His daughters were, by entail, excluded from their grandfather's inheritance.

References 

1360 deaths
1335 births
14th-century English people
Earls of Warwick
Heirs apparent who never acceded